Joseph Kenneth Donlan (27 September 1927 – 23 May 1994) was a British newspaper editor.

Donlan was born in Salford and worked for the Daily Mail for 25 years at their offices in London and Manchester. In 1971 he moved to rival tabloid The Sun where he became news editor. He was briefly editor of the News of the World from 1980 to 1981 before returning to The Sun as managing editor. In 1989, he became the first national newspaper ombudsman in the United Kingdom.

Donlan died at the age of 66 in Chislehurst.

References

1927 births
1994 deaths
People from Salford
British newspaper editors
News of the World people
Daily Mail journalists
The Sun (United Kingdom) people